The South Dakota State Historical Society Press is an American book publishing company based in Pierre, South Dakota. It was established in 1997 and it is a part of the South Dakota State Historical Society.

References

External links
Website of South Dakota State Historical Society Press
 https://www.facebook.com/SDSHSPress
 http://www.sdshspress.wordpress.com
 http://www.sdshsp.tumblr.com
 http://pioneergirlproject.org

Book publishing companies of the United States
Publishing companies established in 1997